The Glâmbocel is a left tributary of the river Budișteanca in Romania. It flows into the Budișteanca in Budișteni.

References

Rivers of Romania
Rivers of Argeș County